The molecular formula C9H14N2O (molar mass: 166.22 g/mol, exact mass: 166.1106 u) may refer to:

 ABT-418
 3-Isobutyl-2-methoxypyrazine
 Phenoxypropazine

Molecular formulas